ADAC Formel Masters was an ADAC sanctioned open wheel racing series based in Germany, held annually from 2008 to 2014. It was replacement of the local Formula BMW championship. The first season was in 2008 and is the main feeder series to the ATS Formula 3 Cup (German Formula Three Championship). Like Formula Ford, French F4 Championship and Formula Abarth, the Formel Masters is aimed at karting graduates. In 2015 it was replaced by the ADAC Formula 4.

Race weekend
A race weekend features one 45-minute practice session on Friday, and one 30-minute qualifying session on the same day, followed by three races. The qualifying session is a straight fight for the fastest laptime, and determines the order of the grids for Races 1 & 2.

Race 3 is on Sunday. The grid is decided by the Race 2 result with top 8 being reversed, so the driver who finished 8th on Saturday will start from pole position and the winner will start from 8th place.

Each races longs for 25 minutes.

Scoring system

2008-2010

2011

2012-2014

No points for pole or fastest lap were awarded
With this points system, the most points anyone can score in one round is 65 by winning each race. In Hockenheim round of 2012, Marvin Kirchhöfer became first driver to score all points of the weekend with this point system.

Results

See also
ADAC
German Formula Three Championship
International Formula Master

References

External links
ADAC Formel Masters official website
ADAC Masters Weekend

 
Formula racing series
Formula racing
2008 establishments in Germany
2014 disestablishments in Germany
Recurring sporting events established in 2008
Recurring events disestablished in 2014
Defunct auto racing series